France was present at the Eurovision Song Contest 1979, held in Jerusalem.

Before Eurovision

Internal selection 
The French national final to select their entry, Concours de la Chanson Française pour l'Eurovision 1979, was to be held on 4 March 1979 at the TF1 Studios in Paris, but the Société Française de Production, the French film technicians' union, went on strike, barring the semi-finals from airing and the finals from being taped at all. A professional jury picked the winner out of a pool of 14 semi-finalists.

The winning entry was "Je suis l'enfant soleil", performed by Anne Marie David and composed by Eddy Marnay with lyrics by Hubert Giraud. Despite the strike, Anne Marie David's semi-final performance was allowed to be shown during Preview Week.

At Eurovision 
Anne Marie David performed eleventh on the night of the contest, following Israel and preceding Belgium. At the close of the voting the song had received 106 points, placing 3rd in a field of 19 competing countries.

Voting

References 

1979
Countries in the Eurovision Song Contest 1979
Eurovision
Eurovision